Golemović (known as the Golemovići, Големовићи) was a Serbian noble family during the Serbian Despotate (1403–1459). They were influential during the rule of Despot Đurađ Branković (1427–1456).

Members
Oliver Golemović (Olko), was a Serbian commander under Đurađ Branković, kefalija of Priština, later worked in the Ježevo estate of Mara Branković where he also died.
Đurađ Golemović (Đura, Đorđe), was a diplomat and judge of Đurađ Branković, later chief at Priština. He was sent twice to negotiate with Sultan Murad II at Edirne. He is mentioned in Serbian epic poetry as Golemović Đura (in Smrt vojvode Kajice).

References

Serbian noble families
15th-century Serbian nobility